Events from the year 1831 in Germany

Incumbents
 Kingdom of Prussia
 Monarch – Frederick William III of Prussia (16 November 1797 – 7 June 1840)
 Kingdom of Bavaria
 Monarch - Ludwig I (1825–1848)
 Kingdom of Saxony
 Anthony (5 May 1827 – 6 June 1836)
 Kingdom of Hanover
 William IV (26 June 1830 to 1837)
 Kingdom of Württemberg
 William (1816–1864)

Events 

2 May - The Polytechnic Institute, today's Leibniz University Hanover established. Founded on 2 May 1831, it is one of the largest and oldest science and technology universities in Germany.

Births 
 7 January – Heinrich von Stephan, German postal union organizer (d. 1897)
 26 January – Heinrich Anton de Bary, German botanist, mycologist (d. 1888)
 24 February – Leo von Caprivi, Chancellor of Germany (d. 1899)
 8 September – Wilhelm Raabe, German novelist (d. 1910)
 18 September – Siegfried Marcus, German-born automobile pioneer (d. 1898)
 6 October – Richard Dedekind, German mathematician (d. 1916)
 18 October – Frederick III, German Emperor (d. 1888)

Deaths 

21 January – Ludwig Achim von Arnim, German poet (b. 1781)
17 February – Friedrich Wilhelm, Duke of Schleswig-Holstein-Sonderburg-Glücksburg (b. 1785)
25 February – Friedrich Maximilian Klinger, German dramatist and novelist, originator of Sturm und Drang (born 1752)
5 August – Sébastien Érard, German-born French instrument maker (b. 1752)
24 August – August von Gneisenau, Prussian field marshal (b. 1760)
28 September – Philippine Engelhard, German writer, scholar (b. 1756)
14 November – Georg Hegel, German philosopher (b. 1770)
16 November – Carl von Clausewitz, German military strategist (b. 1780)

References 

Years of the 19th century in Germany
Germany
Germany